Silvia Reize (1948–2012) was a Swiss television and film actress.

Selected filmography

Film
 My Daughter, Your Daughter (1972)
 Steppenwolf (1974)
 Die Magd (1976)
  (1976)
 The Second Awakening of Christa Klages (1978)
 Goetz von Berlichingen of the Iron Hand (1979)
  (1981, TV film)
  (1985)

Television Series
  (1975, TV miniseries)
 Sun, Wine and Hard Nuts (1981)
 The Old Fox (1982)
 Beautiful Wilhelmine (1984)

References

Bibliography
 Klossner, Michael. The Europe of 1500–1815 on Film and Television: A Worldwide Filmography of Over 2550 Works, 1895 Through 2000. McFarland & Company, 2002.

External links

1948 births
2012 deaths
Swiss film actresses
Swiss television actresses
People from Bern